The 1994 NCAA Division I men's basketball tournament involved 64 schools playing in single-elimination play to determine the national champion of men's NCAA Division I college basketball. It began on March 17, 1994, and ended with the championship game on April 4 in Charlotte, North Carolina, played at Charlotte Coliseum. A total of 63 games were played.

The Final Four consisted of Arkansas, making their fifth trip and first since 1990, Arizona , Florida, making their first ever trip, and Duke, making their sixth trip in the last seven tournaments.

In the national championship game, Arkansas defeated Duke by a score of 76–72 and won their first ever national championship.

Schedule and venues

The following are the sites that were selected to host each round of the 1994 tournament:

First and Second Rounds
March 17 and 19
East Region
 Nassau Veterans Memorial Coliseum, Uniondale, New York (Hosts: St. John's University, Big East Conference)
Midwest Region
 Kansas Coliseum, Wichita, Kansas (Host: Wichita State University)
Southeast Region
 Rupp Arena, Lexington, Kentucky (Host: University of Kentucky)
West Region
 Dee Events Center, Ogden, Utah (Host: Weber State University)
March 18 and 20
East Region
 USAir Arena, Landover, Maryland (Host: George Mason University)
Midwest Region
 Myriad Convention Center, Oklahoma City, Oklahoma (Host: University of Oklahoma)
Southeast Region
 Thunderdome, St. Petersburg, Florida (Host: University of South Florida)
West Region
 ARCO Arena, Sacramento, California (Hosts: University of the Pacific, Big West Conference)

Regional semifinals and finals (Sweet Sixteen and Elite Eight)
March 24 and 26
Southeast Regional, Thompson–Boling Arena, Knoxville, Tennessee (Hosts: University of Tennessee, Southeastern Conference)
West Regional, Los Angeles Memorial Sports Arena, Los Angeles, California (Hosts: University of Southern California, Pacific-10 Conference)
March 25 and 27
East Regional, Miami Arena, Miami, Florida (Host: University of Miami)
Midwest Regional, Reunion Arena, Dallas, Texas (Host: Southwest Conference)

National semifinals and championship (Final Four and championship)
April 2 and 4
Charlotte Coliseum, Charlotte, North Carolina (Host: University of North Carolina at Charlotte)

Qualifying teams

Listed by region and seeding

Bracket
* – Denotes overtime period

East Regional – Miami, Florida

Southeast Regional – Knoxville, Tennessee

Midwest Regional – Dallas, Texas

West Regional – Los Angeles, California

West Region First round

West Region Second Round

Final Four – Charlotte, North Carolina

Broadcast information
On television, CBS Sports covered all 63 games of the tournament, with regional splits until the Regional Finals followed by national telecasts.

Exclusive national radio coverage was provided by CBS Radio Sports.

CBS announcers
James Brown/Jim Nantz and Billy Packer – Brown/Packer, First & Second Round at Uniondale, New York; Nantz/Packer, Midwest Regional at Dallas, Texas; Final Four at Charlotte, North Carolina
Dick Stockton and Al McGuire – First & Second Round at Lexington, Kentucky; West Regional at Los Angeles
Greg Gumbel and Bill Raftery – First & Second Round at Landover, Maryland; Southeast Regional at Knoxville, Tennessee
Verne Lundquist and Dan Bonner/Clark Kellogg – Lundquist/Bonner, First & Second Round at St. Petersburg, Florida; Lundquist/Kellogg, East Regional at Miami
Sean McDonough and Derrek Dickey – First & Second Round at Wichita, Kansas
Ted Robinson and Greg Kelser – First & Second Round at Oklahoma City
Tim Ryan and Ann Meyers – First & Second Round at Ogden, Utah
Dave Sims and Larry Farmer – First & Second Round at Sacramento, California

CBS Radio Sports announcers
– First & Second Round at Ogden, Utah

Local announcers

See also
 1994 NCAA Division II men's basketball tournament
 1994 NCAA Division III men's basketball tournament
 1994 NCAA Division I women's basketball tournament
 1994 NCAA Division II women's basketball tournament
 1994 NCAA Division III women's basketball tournament
 1994 National Invitation Tournament
 1994 National Women's Invitation Tournament
 1994 NAIA Division I men's basketball tournament
 1994 NAIA Division II men's basketball tournament
 1994 NAIA Division I women's basketball tournament
 1994 NAIA Division II women's basketball tournament

References

NCAA Division I men's basketball tournament
Ncaa
NCAA Men's Division I Basketball Championship
NCAA Division I men's basketball tournament
NCAA Division I men's basketball tournament
Basketball competitions in Charlotte, North Carolina
College basketball tournaments in North Carolina